The Academy of West Ham United F.C. is recognised as one of the most successful football academies in modern football, hence its nickname the Academy of Football.

The introduction of the FA's new Academy system in 1998 has placed even more emphasis on the developing of young homegrown players and today the youth system at West Ham is more important than it has ever been. With the influx of many foreign players in the Premier League during modern times, West Ham United has been regarded as one of the few remaining clubs in top flight to continue producing and playing homegrown English players.

The Under-21 team is the most senior of West Ham's youth squads. The Under-21 team is effectively the club's second-string side, but is limited to five outfield players and one goalkeeper over the age of 21 per game following the introduction of new regulations from the 2022–23 season. They play in Premier League 2 and also compete in the Papa John's Trophy.

The Academy of Football

 'The Academy of Football' , or just 'The Academy', is a nickname of West Ham United. The title pays homage to the success of the club in coaching talented young players. The title, originally attributed to the club by the press, has since been officially adopted by the club and is displayed in several prominent places around the stadium such as being printed beside the club crest on the artificial surface surrounding the pitch at Upton Park.

The original tribute intended to reference the entire culture of the club, in much the same way as the Liverpool "Boot Room". It was not solely reserved for the education of young players, but also for the development of a modern approach to football from the roots up, as inspired by the success of the Hungarian national team featuring Ferenc Puskás that had humiliated England 6–3, and the great Real Madrid side of the late 1950s that dominated the European Cup.

Academy history
The 'Academy of Football' term was first used in the early years of Ron Greenwood's reign as West Ham manager (1961–1974).  Greenwood had inherited a young team of players from Ted Fenton and the club was noted for its reliance on home grown talent with Bobby Moore, Martin Peters, Geoff Hurst, John Lyall, Ronnie Boyce, John Sissons, Alan Sealey and Harry Redknapp all in the first team or periphery.  Further foundations had been laid with stalwart Ken Brown at the back, Malcolm Musgrove on the left wing (who was to leave in the second season), and the addition of John "Budgie" Byrne up front.

The true heritage of this side, however, owed its pedigree to the practices put in place by the previous manager.

Fenton was praised as a forward thinking manager.  He pushed for the establishment of "The Academy" that brought through a series of young players to augment a side that could not be improved with the limited finances available.  Two of the signings he did manage to make were those of John Dick and Malcolm Allison.  Other players of the day included John Bond, Dave Sexton, Jimmy Andrews and Frank O'Farrell (later swapped for Eddie Lewis) and Tommy Moroney all part of an original 'Cafe Cassettari' club started by Fenton as a result of the restrictive budget.

Cassettari's Café sat opposite the Boleyn Ground, and Fenton organised a deal that saw meals and a warm welcome for the players of the club at a price the club could manage.  It became a place for routine discussion of the team, and ideas and wisdom freely passed back and forth. The tradition of mentorship lasted long into the 1960s even after Fenton had moved on and saw future managers John Lyall and Harry Redknapp pass through. West Ham, with meetings at Cassettari's Café, soon gained a reputation for producing managers via playing for the club including Malcolm Allison, Noel Cantwell, Frank O'Farrell, John Bond, Dave Sexton, Jimmy Andrews and Malcolm Musgrove.

Fenton introduced continental ideas to the team, revamping training methods and taking inspiration from higher ranked teams, and even inspiring some. Fenton had been impressed greatly by the all conquering Hungarians of the 1950s led by Ferenc Puskás and the Cassettari program and development of the academy were at the core. Ernie Gregory said (of the 1950s diet) "We'd usually eaten fish or chicken and toast before then, but Dr. Thomas advised us all to eat steak and rice two hours before kick-off. All the other clubs copied us after that". However, not all the changes were strictly down to Fenton, Musgrove attributed much of the training regime to Allison, going so far as to state that once the players were at the club (signed by Fenton) they were pretty much Allisons property. As well as being a student of the game himself, Fenton encouraged all players to take coaching badges and it's notable that many of his former players went on to coaching and managing roles after they retired. The Academy also involved, beyond the routine training and development of the youth and squad, actual tactical discussions between the players.

At this time, three players who had come through the West Ham youth development system were seeing some success in the England squad; they were Bobby Moore who debuted in 1962, Geoff Hurst and Martin Peters.

In 1966, these players played a part in England's victory in the World Cup.

Moore was the most well-known of the three. He captained the England squad and was later named by Pelé as the "greatest" of all the defenders he had played against.

In the World Cup final against West Germany in which England won 4–2, Hurst scored the only hat-trick ever scored at a World Cup final match, and Peters scored the other goal. This gave rise to the West Ham supporters' partly tongue-in-cheek terrace chant:

A bronze statue of these three players (and Everton defender Ray Wilson) holding the Jules Rimet Trophy aloft was erected in 2003 at the junction of Barking Road and Green Street close to Upton Park.

During the next thirty years West Ham's youth academy produced many professional players. Notable Academy "graduates" during this time include Frank Lampard Sr. and (later Sir) Trevor Brooking, who both featured in the club's 1975 FA Cup win with a team composed solely of English players; no club since has repeated this accomplishment.

Since 1973 the Academy has been managed by Tony Carr, himself a "graduate" but whose career was cut short by injury.

Paul Ince played his first game for West Ham in 1986, and went on to win more trophies than any other Academy "graduate", albeit with Manchester United.

Premier League era
In 1996, the reputation of the Academy began a fresh revival with the arrival of Rio Ferdinand and Frank Lampard Jnr. That year, the West Ham youth team reached the FA Youth Cup Final, losing to a Liverpool side inspired by Michael Owen. However, both Ferdinand and Lampard would see success in subsequent years.

In 1999, the West Ham youth team won the FA Youth Cup, beating Coventry City 9–0 on aggregate. The team featured Joe Cole and Michael Carrick. Ferdinand and Carrick played against Lampard and Cole when Manchester United met Chelsea at the 2008 UEFA Champions League Final.

Recent Academy "graduates" include Glen Johnson, Billy Mehmet, Freddy Eastwood, Anton Ferdinand (younger brother of Rio), Elliott Ward, Mark Noble, Jack Collison, James Tomkins and Declan Rice.

Relationship with West Ham United 
The Academy is an important part of the club's identity and a regular source of players for the first team. When the club was relegated from the FA Premier League in 2003, the sale of young Academy stars arguably saved the club from financial disaster. It has been argued that if West Ham had kept all of their Academy "graduates" since Rio Ferdinand, they would currently be among the very top English teams.

With their promotion via the Championship Play-Offs in 2005 West Ham have returned to England's top league. Three Academy "graduates" had been key players in this achievement; Anton Ferdinand, Elliott Ward, and Mark Noble. In the 2007–08 season, manager Alan Curbishley handed three graduates, Jack Collison, James Tomkins and Freddie Sears, their debuts.

Gianfranco Zola, who previously worked with the Italy U-21's, stated his desire to continue the club's tradition of using homegrown talent. Noble, Tomkins and Collison all went on to play an important part as West Ham beat relegation to finish 9th in the 2008–09 season. Under him, Zavon Hines and Junior Stanislas have impressed after the August 2009 League Cup match against Millwall where they both scored in a 3–1 win.

West Ham as a 'selling club' 
A case may be made that West Ham has been a 'selling club' in recent years, that is, a club that provides quality players to other clubs for profit but does not have the prestige or financial means to keep those players for the benefit of their own team. This reputation probably began with the sale of Rio Ferdinand to Leeds United in 2000. Since then, West Ham have sold six Academy "graduates" for transfer fees totalling over £50 million (including £18 million for Ferdinand, who was later sold on to Manchester United for £30 million). This amount has traditionally been much greater than the club's own spending on players (most of which was financed by the above income), and many of the players found success with financially stronger clubs such as Chelsea and Manchester United who are two of the English clubs capable of competing on a different level to most other teams.

Though not a club, the England national team has included various academy apprentices or graduates in recent years, including Rio Ferdinand, Michael Carrick, Frank Lampard, Joe Cole, Jermain Defoe and Glen Johnson, as well as John Terry who spent part of his development with the club.

Quotes 
"The crowds at West Ham have never been rewarded by results but they keep turning up because of the good football they see. Other clubs will suffer from the old bugbear that results count more than anything. This has been the ruination of English soccer." – Ron Greenwood, West Ham manager 1961–1974.

"No way is it all down to me. It's very difficult to say why we've been so successful in youth terms; I suppose it's down to a number of factors but, most importantly, our recruitment area of east London and Essex is really fertile." – Tony Carr, director of Youth Development at West Ham 1973–2010, quoted in an interview published by The Daily Telegraph 14 June 2004.

"Why should we sell Rio Ferdinand? Are we a Premier League club or are we just a feeder club for bigger clubs? If we start selling players like Rio, where is the club going to go?" – Harry Redknapp, West Ham manager 1994–2001.

"The biggest single contributor to the current England national squad is not Manchester United, Arsenal, Liverpool or Chelsea, but the West Ham Youth Academy." – ITV Football article, 13 September 2004.

Reserve team history

The West Ham United Reserves Team was founded in 1899 as Thames Ironworks Reserves and they changed their name to West Ham Reserves in 1900. They joined London League Division One in the season 1899–1900. In 2007–08 they were FA Premier Reserve League Southern Division runners-up on goal difference.

'A' team
Between 1948 and 1956 West Ham entered an 'A' team into the Eastern Counties League. In 1952 they also began playing in the Metropolitan League. After leaving the ECL they remained in the Metropolitan League, winning the League Cup in 1957–58 and the Professional Cup in 1959–60, 1966–67 and 1968–69. They left the league when it merged into the Metropolitan London League in 1971, and instead entered a youth team into the South East Counties League, which they won in 1984–85, 1995–96 and 1997–98, before leaving when the FA Academy system was set up in 1998.

Under-21 team
The West Ham United Reserves competed in the Premier Reserve League South until relegation from the Premier League. The side is now classed as a development squad coached by Dmitri Halajko and Steve Potts. Friendly games were usually played at Chadwell Heath and other clubs training grounds.

Since the 2012–13 season, the team have played in the Professional Development League (now branded Premier League 2) for players under the age of 21 and a restricted number of over age players. Most home matches are played at West Ham's training ground (Rush Green), with three fixtures per season played at the London Stadium.

Current squad
Players (excluding scholars) who will qualify as U21s in season 2022–23 and who are outside the first team squad.

 U18 represents an U18 squad player who has represented the U23s in the 2022–23 season.
 U16 represents an U16 squad player (a non-scholar) who has represented the U23s in the 2022–23 season.
 Squad numbers represent numbers given to players for first team and EFL Trophy matches only.

U18

 U18

Out on loan

Under-18 team
The West Ham under-18's play in the U18 Premier League South. Home games are staged at Little Heath, Hainault Road in Romford, Essex. Tony Carr, a former West Ham player himself, was the youth academy director from 1973 to 2014. They have won the U19 title twice in 1998–99 and 1999–2000, when the Academy League was split into the U17s and U21s.

Current squad

 U16 represents an U16 squad player (a non-scholar) who has represented the U18s in the 2022–24 season.
 † represents a player who represented the U18s in the 2022–23 season before later leaving the club.

Honours

Reserves Team
South-East County League: 1985, 1996, 1998
Premier League Cup: 2016
Premier League 2 Division 2: 
 Winners (1):  2020
 Runners-up (1): 2017

Academy Team
FA Youth Cup: 1963, 1981, 1999
Premier Academy U19 League: 1999, 2000

Notable players 
Alongside West Ham's aforementioned representation in the 1966 FIFA World Cup Final, the club also produced Clyde Best, Ade Coker and Clive Charles through their academy - with the trio making Football League history, by becoming the first three black players to start a game in the competition. Coker scored the second in the game against Tottenham Hotspur, on 1 April 1972, securing a 2–0 win for West Ham.

Internationally capped players (pre-2000)

First team graduates since 2000
Since the turn of the century, every permanent first team manager has enabled a player from West Ham's youth teams to represent the first team. The following table shows every player to have made at least one first team appearance in all competitions. Players highlighted in green are still contracted to West Ham.

Other players 
These players either trained at the Academy but never played for West Ham first team or trained at multiple clubs in their youth. Only permanent spells are shown.

Sol Campbell made his debut at Tottenham Hotspur in 1992, and became a regular England player in the late 1990s. In 2001, when his contract ran out, he joined Arsenal. Campbell was a regular player for club and country, and has won the Premier League twice and the FA Cup three times while with Arsenal. He was named in the official Euro 2004 All-Star squad by the UEFA technical group.
Career: 1992–2011; Tottenham Hotspur, Arsenal, Portsmouth, Notts County, Newcastle United
International caps: 73 caps, 1 goal

John Terry was schooled by both West Ham's and Chelsea's youth teams at different times. His debut for Chelsea was in 1998 and became captain of the side in the 2003/2004 season. The following season he helped Chelsea set a new record, the side having conceded only 14 goals in the entire league season. He was also voted PFA Players' Player of the Year in 2005.
Career: 1998–2018; Chelsea, Aston Villa
International caps: 78 caps, 8 goals

Kieran Richardson started with the West Ham youth academy but was picked up by Manchester United's youth academy as a teenager.
Career: 2002–2016; Manchester United, Sunderland, Fulham, Aston Villa, Cardiff City
International caps: 8 caps, 2 goals

Freddy Eastwood was previously a trainee at Southend United but moved to the West Ham Academy at age 15. He was unable to break into the first team and was released by then-manager Glenn Roeder. After starting out at non-League side Grays Athletic, he eventually worked his way up the league, signing for Championship sides Wolverhampton Wanderers and Coventry City. He represented Wales, qualifying through his grandmother.
Career: 2002–2015; Grays Athletic, Southend United, Wolverhampton Wanderers,  Coventry City
International caps: 11 caps, 4 goals

Jlloyd Samuel joined West Ham from youth club Senrab, later moving to Charlton Athletic. Samuel later signed for Aston Villa, making 169 Premier League appearances at the club, as well as 71 league appearances for Bolton Wanderers, before playing domestic football in Iran.
Career: 2002–2015; Aston Villa, Bolton Wanderers, Esteghlal, Paykan, Egerton
International caps: 2 caps, 0 goals

Fitz Hall was released by West Ham at the age of 15, initially playing in non-league and the lower leagues, before signing for Southampton in 2004. Hall later signed for Crystal Palace, captaining the club. Hall signed for Queens Park Rangers in 2008, making 85 league appearances for the club. Hall retired in 2014, following a two-year spell with Watford.
Career: 2000–2014; Barnet, Chesham United, Oldham Athletic, Southampton, Crystal Palace, Wigan Athletic, Queens Park Rangers, Watford

Billy Mehmet was signed at the age of 8 years old and remained at the club until he was 19 years of age. During his time at West Ham, Mehmet was given his debut by Harry Redknapp at the age of 16 during a testimonial game. Mehmet was seen as the academies next promising graduate and was rewarded by being handed the captaincy of the reserve and youth team. Mehmet was released by the club at 19 years old by the then manager Glenn Roeder after the club was relegated. He then transferred to Dunfermline Athletic in the SPL, before moving onto St Mirren. After his time in Scotland, Mehmet later played in Turkey, Australia, Thailand, India and Singapore. Mehmet represented Northern Cyprus at the 2018 ConIFA World Football Cup.
Career: 2003–; Dunfermline Athletic, St Mirren, Gençlerbirliği, Samsunspor, Perth Glory, Bangkok Glass, Dempo, Kedah FA, Sarawak FA, Tampines Rovers, DPMM, Merit Alsancak Yeşilova
International caps: 5 caps, 4 goals

Jimmy Bullard began his senior career in non-league, after playing in the youth set-up at West Ham, before re-signing for West Ham. After two years at the club, without making an appearance, Bullard signed for Peterborough United. Bullard won promotion to the Premier League with Wigan Athletic. Bullard spent a total of six seasons in the Premier League, with Wigan, Fulham and Hull City
Career: 1997–2012: Corinthian, Dartford, Gravesend & Northfleet, Peterborough United, Wigan Athletic, Fulham, Hull City, Ipswich Town, Milton Keynes Dons

Kortney Hause spent eight years in West Ham's academy, moving to Birmingham City, before making his senior breakthrough at Wycombe Wanderers. In 2019, Hause made his debut in the Premier League for Aston Villa.
Career: 2012–: Wycombe Wanderers, Wolverhampton Wanderers, Aston Villa

English top division

Alan Curbishley – England U21 International
Alan Dickens – England U21 International
Anton Ferdinand – England U21 International
Bobby Barnes
Lee Hodges
Shaun Byrne – Rep of Ireland U21 International
Simon Clarke
Eamonn Dolan – Rep of Ireland U21 International
Geoff Pike – FA Cup Winner
George Parris
Jimmy Bullard
Kevin Keen
Kyel Reid – England U17/U18/U19 International
Mervyn Day – FA Cup Winner
Paul Allen – FA Cup Winner
Paul Brush – FA Cup Winner
Steve Potts
Stuart Slater – England U21/B International
Danny Williamson
Jlloyd Samuel – England U21 International
Fitz Hall
Liam Ridgewell – England U19/U21 International
Emmanuel Omoyinmi
Elliott Ward
Everald La Ronde
Greg Campbell
Keith McPherson
Matthew Rush
Leon Britton
Junior Stanislas – England U21 international
Freddie Sears – England U19/U21 international
James Tomkins – England U19/U21 international
Grady Diangana – England U19/U21 international

English 2nd tier or below

Billy Lansdowne
Dale Banton
Lee Boylan
Scott Canham
Nicky Morgan
Paul Kelly
Paul Marquis
Phil Brignull
Simon Livett
Steve Banks
Stevland Angus
Trent McClenahan – Australia U20/U23 International
Chris Cohen
Michael Ferrante – Australia U17/U20 International
Anwar Uddin
Gary Alexander
Jamie Victory
Joe Widdowson
Daryl McMahon
Mark Smith
Tony Stokes
Terrell Forbes
Stephen Purches
Billy Mehmet
Izzy Iriekpen
Greg Pearson
Ryan O'Neill
David Partridge
Lee Goodwin
Olly Lee
Anthony Edgar
Cristian Montaño
Steven Clark
Ahmed Abdulla
Jordan Brown
Callum McNaughton
Robert Hall
Dan Potts
Callum Driver
Eoin Wearen
George Moncur
Matthias Fanimo
Dylan Tombides
Sam Cowler
Blair Turgott
Paul McCallum
Dominic Vose
Leo Chambers
Pelly Ruddock
Sebastian Lletget
Reece Burke
Jamie Harney
Hogan Ephraim
Zavon Hines
Josh Payne
Anthony Scully
Jahmal Hector-Ingram
George Dobson
Moses Makasi
Marcus Browne
Djair Parfitt-Williams
Alex Pike
Lewis Page

References

External links
 Why is West Ham's academy providing diminishing returns? – These Football Times (2017)

Reserves And Academy
Football academies in England
Eastern Counties Football League
Metropolitan League
Premier League International Cup
Professional Development League
London League (football)
South Essex League